Hirose Dam is a rockfill dam located in Yamanashi Prefecture in Japan. The dam is used for flood control, irrigation, water supply and power production. The catchment area of the dam is 76.6 km2. The dam impounds about 55  ha of land when full and can store 14300 thousand cubic meters of water. The construction of the dam was started on 1965 and completed in 1974.

References

Dams in Yamanashi Prefecture
1974 establishments in Japan